Lorena Blanco (born July 22, 1977) is a badminton player from Peru, who won two bronze medals at the 2003 Pan American Games.

She played badminton at the 2004 Summer Olympics, losing to Wang Chen of Hong Kong in the round of 32.

In 1996 she was triple champion at the South American Badminton Championships winning the women's singles, women's doubles (with Ximena Bellido) and mixed doubles (with Gustavo Salazar) events.

References

1977 births
Living people
Peruvian female badminton players
Badminton players at the 2004 Summer Olympics
Olympic badminton players of Peru
Badminton players at the 2003 Pan American Games
Badminton players at the 1999 Pan American Games
Badminton players at the 1995 Pan American Games
Pan American Games bronze medalists for Peru
Pan American Games medalists in badminton
Medalists at the 2003 Pan American Games
20th-century Peruvian women
21st-century Peruvian women